Al Norman is the founder of Sprawl-Busters, a noted anti-sprawl activism organization.  He achieved national notice in 1993 during a protracted battle to prevent a Wal-Mart store from being opened in Greenfield, Massachusetts.

Norman is the author of three books – The Case Against Wal-Mart (2004) and Slam-Dunking Wal-Mart! (1999) – about grassroots activism fighting retail development. His most recent book, published in May 2012, is Occupy Walmart, a collection of essays published in the Huffington Post.

Norman has appeared on 60 Minutes, Nightline, and The Osgood File, and in hundreds of local newspapers across the nation. Forbes magazine called Norman "Wal-Mart's #1 enemy". His work has been featured in such documentaries as Wal-Mart: The High Cost of Low Price, Store Wars: When Wal-Mart Comes to Town, Wal-Mart Nation, and Talking to the Wal. Norman says that over the past two decades he has helped stop more big box projects than any other person on the globe.

References

External links
 Sprawl Busters site

Living people
Year of birth missing (living people)
People from Greenfield, Massachusetts
American activists
American non-fiction writers